Saint-Paul-Trois-Châteaux, sometimes known as -en-Tricastin, is a commune, an administrative region, in the Drôme department in southeastern France.

Name
The settlement is attested as Augusta Tricastinorum (1st c. AD), Trikastinoi ōn polis Noiomagos (2nd c.), Sancti Pauli vel Sancti Restituti Trigastinensi (993), in Tricastrinensi (1132), civitate Tricastrina (1136), San Paul (ca. 1180), Sanctum Paulum Tricastinensem (1338), and Sainct Pol Trois Chasteaux (1545).

The toponym derives from the name of the ancient Gallic tribe that dwelled in the region, the Tricastini. The insertion of an epenthetic r that changed Tricastini to Tricastrini, which is attested by the 12th century, caused a semantic reinterpretation of the name, leading eventually to the modern French Trois-Châteaux, meaning 'three-castles' (Latin Tria-Castra).

Population

Sport
It was the start of stage 16 of the 2011 Tour de France,    to Gap, as well as the start city for stage 13 of the 2012 Tour de France,  to Cap d'Agde.

Twin towns — sister cities
Saint-Paul-Trois-Châteaux is twinned with:

  Eltmann, Germany (1975)
  Trecate, Italy (2003)

See also
Communes of the Drôme department
Saint-Paul-Trois-Châteaux Cathedral
Tricastin
Tricastin Nuclear Power Plant

References

External links

 Picture of Saint-Paul-Trois-Châteaux Cathedral

Communes of Drôme